Claude Austin Trevor Schilsky (7 October 1897 – 22 January 1978) was an Irish actor who had a long career in film and television.

He played the parson in John Galsworthy's Escape at the world premiere in London's West End in 1926 and was the only member of the cast to transfer to New York City for the Broadway production a year later.
He was the first actor to play Agatha Christie's detective Hercule Poirot on screen in three British films during the early 1930s: Alibi (1931), Black Coffee (1931) and Lord Edgware Dies (1934). He subsequently turned up in a character part in a later Poirot adaptation The Alphabet Murders in 1965. He stated that he only got the Poirot role because he could speak with a French accent.

During the 1960s he worked largely in television, appearing in series such as The First Churchills in which he played Lord Halifax. He appeared in an episode of the legal drama The Main Chance.

He died in Bury St. Edmunds, Suffolk.

Filmography

 The W Plan (1930) as Captain of Military Police
 At the Villa Rose (1930) as  Inspector Hanaud
 Escape (1930) as Parson
 The Man from Chicago (1930) as Inspector Drew
 Alibi (1931) as Hercule Poirot
 A Night in Montmartre (1931) as Paul deLisle
 Black Coffee (1931) as Hercule Poirot
 The Crooked Lady (1932) as Captain James Kent
 The Chinese Puzzle (1932) as Paul Markatel
 A Safe Proposition (1932) as Count Tonelli
 On Secret Service (1933) as Captain Larco
 The Broken Melody (1934) as  Pierre Falaise
 Lord Edgware Dies (1934) as Hercule Poirot
 Death at Broadcasting House (1934) as Leopold Dryden
 Inside the Room (1935) as Pierre Santos
 Mimi (1935) as Lamotte
 Royal Cavalcade (1935) as Captain Oates
 The Silent Passenger (1935) as Inspector Parker
 Parisian Life (1936) as Don Joao
 La Vie parisienne (1936) as Don Joâo 
 The Beloved Vagabond (1936) as Count de Verneuil
 As You Like It (1936) as Le Beau
 Dusty Ermine (1936) as Swiss Hotelier-Gang Leader
 Rembrandt (1936) as Marquis
 Sabotage (1936) as Vladimir - Paymaster at Aquarium 
 Knight Without Armour (1937) as Dodctor Muller
 Dark Journey (1937) as Colonel Adraxine
 Goodbye, Mr. Chips (1939) as Ralston
 The Followers (1939, television film of the play by Harold Brighouse) as Colonel Redfern
 The Lion Has Wings (1939) as  Schulemburg - German Air Chief of Staff
 Law and Disorder (1940) as Heinreks
 Night Train to Munich (1940) as Captain Prada
 Under Your Hat (1940) as Boris Vladimir
 The Briggs Family (1940) as John Smith
 The Seventh Survivor (1942) as Captain Hartzmann
 The Big Blockade (1942) as German: U-boat Captain
 The Young Mr. Pitt (1942) as French Registrar 
 The New Lot (1943) as Soldier Talking to Corporal 
 Heaven Is Round the Corner (1944) as John Cardew
 Champagne Charlie (1944) as The Duke
 Lisbon Story (1946) as Major Lutzen
 Anna Karenina (1948) as Colonel Vronsky
 The Red Shoes (1948) as Professor Palmer
 So Long at the Fair (1950) as Police Commissaire
 Father Brown (1954) as Herald
 To Paris with Love (1955) as Leon de Colville
 Tons of Trouble (1956) as Sir Hervey Shaw
 Seven Waves Away (1957) as Edward Wilton
 Dangerous Exile (1957) as  Monsieur Petitval
 The Naked Truth (1957) as Minister with Heart Attack 
 Carlton-Browne of the F.O. (1959) as Secretary General 
 Horrors of the Black Museum (1959) as Commissioner Wayne
 Konga (1961) as Dean Foster
 The Day the Earth Caught Fire (1961) as Sir John Kelly
 The Court Martial of Major Keller (1961) as Power
 Never Back Losers (1961) as Colonel Warburton
 The Alphabet Murders (1965) as Judson

Selected stage credits
 Fallen Angels by Noël Coward (1925)
 Escape by John Galsworthy (1926)
 Bitter Sweet by Noël Coward (1929)
 Call It a Day by Dodie Smith (1935)
 Her Excellency by Harold Purcell (1949)

References

External links

1897 births
1978 deaths
20th-century male actors from Northern Ireland
Male actors from Belfast
Male stage actors from Northern Ireland
Male film actors from Northern Ireland
Male television actors from Northern Ireland